Danyal (Arabic/Persian: دانيال, Dányál) is a masculine given name which means known Intellectual and careful to justice is also a variant spelling of Daniel. It is also the Islamic name given to the Prophet Dányál
Which translates to god is my judge. The name Danyal/Daniel is widely used in many languages internationally. The name Danyal also means leader of the people or chief/head of a tribe.
Danyal can also refer to:
 Danial, Ardabil, a village in Iran
 Danial, Mazandaran, a village in Iran
 Mausoleum of Danyal, a mosque, tomb and archaeological site in Tarsus, Turkey
 Kristen Danyal, a contestant in the Miss Michigan USA competition
 Shahzada Danyal, fifteenth-century prince of Bengal